Thieves in KG2 (Haramiyya fi KG2; "Thieves in Kindergarten") is an Egyptian film directed by Sandra Nashaat and screenwritten by Belal Fadl.

Plot
Two thieves, Hasan and Sibae’i, plan to rob the safe in the Kaitby Fortress in Alexandria, but the police capture Sibae’i, who asks Hasan to take care of Nasma, his daughter; if he does this, Sibae’i will not say that Hasan conspired in the robbery attempt. Hasan meets Nasma's teacher, Miss Reem, and the two become romantically involved. Miss Reem does not know of Hasan's history. The film's story settings are Cairo, Alexandria, Port Said, Luxor, and Aswan.

Cast
Karim Abdel Aziz - Hasan
Talaat Zakaria - Sibae’i
Maha Ammar - Nasma
Hanan Tork - Miss Reem
Nashwa Mustafa as Etidal
Maged Al Kedwani
Ragaa Al Geddawi
Sami Maghawri

Reception
After Eid al-Adha the film screened at 30 cinemas in Cairo and other Egyptian cities.

Nur Elmessiri of Al Ahram Weekly wrote that "Egypt has proven that it is capable of producing the cool-cute male, the attractive-cute female and the sassy/bratty-but-cute child, all recognisable members of global pop culture."

See also
 Cinema of Egypt
 Thieves in Thailand

References

External links
 

Egyptian comedy-drama films
2002 films
2002 comedy-drama films